The 2008 Dubai explosion was an industrial explosion at a fireworks factory in the Al Quoz Industrial area on March 26, 2008, in Dubai, United Arab Emirates. One died in the explosion and another died from his injuries at Rashid Hospital. Other than the two killed, two more people were injured in the explosion. 

Over 20 of the 83 buildings in the area were engulfed in flames. There were two explosions that started the fire. The first was at 7:10 AM and was so large it could be felt up to six kilometres away, people at the scene said. The second smaller explosion happened at around 8 a.m. The cause of the explosion is unknown. The blast was followed by a smaller blast, assumed to be the fireworks going off. The area around the blast was occupied by residents, workers, and stores. There were also large work camps with thousands of Asian workers. First responders struggled to get to the scene due to the morning traffic around that area.     The smoke cloud resulted in schools in Al Quoz being evacuated.

See also
 List of 21st-century explosions

References

External links 
Reuters: Blast in Dubai fireworks factory kills 2

Explosions in 2008
2008 industrial disasters
2008 in the United Arab Emirates
Industrial fires and explosions
History of Dubai
Explosions in the United Arab Emirates
Fires in the United Arab Emirates
2000s in Dubai
March 2008 events in Asia
Fireworks accidents and incidents
2008 disasters in the United Arab Emirates